King Micheon of Goguryeo (died 331, r. 300–331) was the 15th ruler of Goguryeo, the northernmost of the Three Kingdoms of Korea.

Family
Father: Prince Dolgo (돌고, 咄固)
Grandfather: King Seocheon (서천왕, 西川王)
Grandmother: Queen, of the U clan (왕후 우씨, 王后 于氏)
Wife: Queen, of the Ju clan (왕후 주씨, 王后 周氏)
Son: Prince Sayu (사유, 斯由; d. 371)
Son: Prince Mu (무, 武)

Background and Rise to the throne 
He was the grandson of the 13th king Seocheon, and the son of the gochuga Go Dol-go, who was killed by his brother, the 14th king Bongsang.

Korean historical records say that Micheon fled and hid as a servant in a miserable life, doing menial tasks such as throwing stones into a pond throughout the night to keep his master from being awakened. It is said a year later he left that house to become salt peddler but failed to gain huge asset. Meanwhile, King Bongsang became increasingly unpopular, and court officials, led by Prime Minister Chang Jo-Ri, carried out a coup that overthrew King Bongsang, and placed King Micheon on the throne.

Reign 
Micheon continuously developed the Goguryeo army into a very powerful force.  During the disintegration of China's Jin Dynasty, he expanded Goguryeo's borders into the Liaodong Peninsula and the other Chinese commanderies. Since the commanderies were nuisances to be eliminated for Goguryeo’s stability, the first military campaign in 302 headed against the Xuantu Commandery, with conquering Daedong River basins of current Pyeongyang. Consolidating cut-off between commanderies and Chinese mainland, Goguryeo also annexed the Lelang commandery in 313 and Daifang commandery in 314 after attacked Seoanpyeong (西安平; near modern Dandong) in Liaodong. The series of subjugation around northern Korean peninsula and Manchuria held its significance given that 400-year presence of Chinese forces was completely cleared out of Korean peninsula.

In his reign, Goguryeo was faced with growing Xianbei influence in the west, particularly Murong Bu (慕容部) incursions into Liaodong. Micheon allied with other Xianbei tribes against the Murong Bu, but their attack was unsuccessful. In 319, the Goguryeo general Yeo Noja (여노자, 如奴子) was taken captive by the Murong Bu. Throughout this period, Goguryeo and the Murongbu attacked each other's positions in Liaodong, but neither was able to secure regional hegemony.
 Since both sides were at stake, Micheon sent its ambassador to Zhou posterior in 330 with a view to making a diversion against Murong Bu from east side.

Death and aftermath 
Micheon died and was buried in 331 at Micheon-won, literally the "garden with beautiful stream". Twelve years later, in the reign of King Gogugwon, his remains were dug up by the Former Yan invaders, and held for ransom.

See also
History of Korea
Three Kingdoms of Korea
List of Korean monarchs

References

Goguryeo rulers
331 deaths
4th-century monarchs in Asia
Year of birth unknown
4th-century Korean people